William Haines Lytle (November 2, 1826 – September 20, 1863) was a politician in Ohio, renowned poet, and military officer in the United States Army during both the Mexican–American War and American Civil War, where he was killed in action as a brigadier general.

Biography
William Haines Lytle was born in Cincinnati, Ohio, the scion of the affluent Lytle family. He graduated from Cincinnati College and studied law. After passing the bar exam, he established a law firm in Cincinnati, but soon enlisted in the 2nd Ohio Volunteer Infantry and served as a captain in the Mexican–American War. After returning from Mexico, Lytle resumed and expanded his legal practice. He was elected to the Ohio state legislature as a Democrat. He unsuccessfully ran for Lieutenant Governor in 1857, losing the election by just a few hundred votes. He was a celebrated American poet before the Civil War. Lytle's most famous poem, "Antony and Cleopatra" (published in 1857), was beloved by both North and South in antebellum America. Lytle was appointed as a major general in the Ohio state militia. In 1860, he unsuccessfully sought the Democratic nomination for his district's seat in the United States House of Representatives. He campaigned in Ohio for the candidacy of Stephen A. Douglas in the 1860 Presidential Election.

When the Civil War erupted in 1861, through his political and military connections, Lytle was commissioned as colonel of the 10th Ohio Infantry. He and his brigade were assigned to western Virginia (now West Virginia), where they engaged in a series of small engagements in a campaign that led to the withdrawal of Confederate forces in that region, helping pave the way for statehood. Lytle was given command of a brigade of infantry. He was severely wounded in his left calf muscle in a fight at Carnifex Ferry on September 10, 1861, and was sent home to recover. After a four-month recuperation, Lytle was assigned commander of the Bardstown, Kentucky military training camp. Returning to field duty, he led a brigade in Maj. Gen. Ormsby M. Mitchel's division. He participated in Mitchel's operations along the Memphis and Chattanooga Railroad. Lytle was again wounded and taken prisoner at the Battle of Perryville in Kentucky on October 8, 1862. He was soon exchanged and rejoined the army. On November 29, Lytle was promoted to brigadier general of volunteers, and led his brigade in numerous engagements in the army of William S. Rosecrans. Admiring officers from his old 10th OVI presented him with a jeweled Maltese cross in September 1863, just eleven days before his death.

Lytle was mortally wounded at the Battle of Chickamauga in Georgia while leading a counterattack on horseback. Once his identity was known,  Confederates placed a guard around his body, and many recited his poetry over their evening campfires. The hill where he died is now known as "Lytle Hill" in the Chickamauga National Military Park.

His funeral was held in the early afternoon at Christ Church on Fourth Street in Cincinnati. So many people lined the streets that the funeral cortege did not reach Spring Grove Cemetery until dusk. Lytle's monument, one of the most impressive ones there, is near the entrance to the cemetery.

Legacy
Lytle never married, and left no direct descendants.

Fort Vinegar, on Vinegar Hill in Bowling Green, was renamed as Fort Lytle after Lytle's death. It is now on the National Register of Historic Places in Warren County, Kentucky.

Lytle Park in Cincinnati, One Lytle Place in Cincinnati, and Lytle Street at 1235 west in Chicago, are named for the fallen general or his family.

Anthology

The shooter

The alleged shooter of Lytle was never discovered. All that is known is that the shooter was a Confederate sniper who used a Whitworth .45 caliber percussion rifle.

However, according to history presented to The Daughters of The Confederacy, the shooter was Hillary Garrison Waldrep of Company B of the 16th Alabama Regiment of Infantry. In order to make the shot that was purportedly approved personally by General Bragg, Waldrep had to adjust the sights on his rifle for 200 yards beyond where they usually were. According to the account, once General Lytle fell to the ground, his horse was spooked and ran toward the Confederate soldiers. Bragg gave Hillary Garrison Waldrep General Lytle's horse, bed-roll and equipment. Waldrep later sold the horse for $100.

Antony and Cleopatra
Lytle's most famous poem, 1858:

See also

 List of American Civil War generals (Union)

References

Further reading
 Carter, Ruth C., For Honor, Glory & Union: The Mexican & Civil War Letters of Brig. Gen. William Haines Lytle. Lexington: University Press of Kentucky, 1999. .

External links
 
 
 
 
 

1826 births
1864 deaths
People of Ohio in the American Civil War
Writers from Cincinnati
Union Army generals
Union military personnel killed in the American Civil War
19th-century American Episcopalians
Politicians from Cincinnati
Burials at Spring Grove Cemetery
American Civil War prisoners of war
Cincinnati in the American Civil War
Democratic Party members of the Ohio House of Representatives
19th-century American politicians
American military personnel of the Mexican–American War